Christopher David Fry (born 23 October 1969) is a Welsh former professional footballer.

Career

Born in Cardiff, Fry began his career at his hometown club Cardiff City, making his debut at the end of the 1988–89 season. Over the next few years, despite playing over 50 times, he struggled to establish himself in the side and more than half of his appearances were as a substitute, with his only goal for the club scored during the 1989–90 season in a 2–2 draw with Brentford. In August 1991 he was allowed to leave the club to sign for Hereford United. He spent just over two season at the club, playing over 100 times, when he was signed by Colchester United where he went on to become an established regular in the side, including winning the club's player of the year award in the 1996–97 season.

Fry left Colchester in 1997 and spent two years at Exeter City before dropping out of league football with spells at Welsh sides Barry Town, Haverfordwest County and Llanelli.

Honours

Club
Colchester United
 Football League Trophy Runner-up (1): 1996–97

Individual
 Colchester United Player of the Year (1): 1997

References

External links

Welsh Premier profile

1969 births
Living people
Footballers from Cardiff
Cardiff City F.C. players
Hereford United F.C. players
Colchester United F.C. players
Exeter City F.C. players
Cheltenham Town F.C. players
English Football League players
Association football wingers
Welsh footballers
Llanelli Town A.F.C. players
Haverfordwest County A.F.C. players
Barry Town United F.C. players